William Henry Macey (14 April 1850 – 30 May 1931) was a photographer who served two terms as Mayor of Blenheim.

Biography

Macey was born in 1850 in Islington, London to William and Elizabeth Macey (née Salmon). Arriving in New Zealand in the year 1857, 
he soon went to Marlborough where he was apprenticed by photographer William Collie.

References

1850 births
Mayors of Blenheim, New Zealand
People from Islington (district)
1931 deaths
British emigrants to New Zealand
19th-century New Zealand photographers
20th-century New Zealand photographers